II is the Roman numeral for 2. 

II may also refer to:

Biology and medicine
Image intensifier, medical imaging equipment
Invariant chain, a polypeptide involved in the formation and transport of MHC class II protein
Optic nerve, the second cranial nerve

Economics 
 Income inequality, or the wealth gap, in economics
 Internationalization Index, used by the UN to rank nations and companies in evaluating their degree of integration with the world economy
 Institutional Investor (magazine), an American finance magazine

Music
 Supertonic, in music
 ii, a 2018 song by CHVRCHES

Albums
II (2 Unlimited album), 1998
II (Aquilo album), 2018
II (Bad Books album), 2012
II (Boyz II Men album), 1994
II (Capital Kings album), 2015
II (Charade album), 2004
II (The Common Linnets album), 2015
II (Compact Disco album), 2011
II (Cursed album), 2005
II (Darna album), 2003
II (Espers album), 2006
II (Fuzz album), 2015
II (Hardline album), 2002
II (High Rise album), 1986
II (Khun Narin album), 2016
II (Kingston Wall album), 1993
II (The Kinleys album), 2000
II (Kurious album), 2009
II (Last in Line album), 2019
II (Lords of Black album), 2016
II (Maylene and the Sons of Disaster album), 2007
II (METZ album), 2015
II (Moderat album), 2013
II (The Presidents of the United States of America album), 1996
II (Sahg album), 2008
II (Seven Thorns album), 2013
II (Unknown Mortal Orchestra album), 2013
II (Xerath album), 2011
II, by Krux, 2006
II, by Majical Cloudz, 2011
II, by Viva Brother, 2017
II, an EP by TNGHT, 2019
Crystal Castles II, 2010
Led Zeppelin II, 1969
Meat Puppets II, 1984
Soul Assassins II, 2000
Viva Koenji!, Koenji Hyakkei album, also known as 弐(II)
Iris II, by Iris, 1987

People and social groups
 Ii is a Japanese surname, daimyō of Hikone:
 Ii clan, Japanese clan (Sengoku period)
 Ii Naomasa, one of four Guardians of the Tokugawa clan
 Ii Naotora, female daimyō and foster mother of Naomasa 
 Ii Naoyuki, a Japanese author
 John Papa ʻĪʻī, a Hawaiian noble

Other uses
 ii (digraph), a digraph in certain romanized alphabets
 ii (IRC client), short for IRC It, an Internet Relay Chat client for Unix-like operating systems
 Ii, Finland, a municipality of Finland
 Illegal immigrant (especially in Hong Kong vernacular)
 Index Islamicus, a bibliography database of publications about Islam and the Muslim world
 Internet Infidels, a discussion forum
IBC Airways (IATA code: II)
 Yi language (ISO 639-1: ii)